King of the Newsboys is a 1938 American film directed by Bernard Vorhaus.

Plot 
Jerry Flynn's girlfriend leaves him for a gangster with power and money, in order to show her that she made a mistake, Jerry starts his newspaper distribution business.

Cast 
Lew Ayres as Jerry Flynn
Helen Mack as Mary Ellen Stephens
Alison Skipworth as Nora
Victor Varconi as Wire Arno
Sheila Bromley as Connie Madison
Alice White as Dolly
Horace McMahon as Lockjaw
William 'Billy' Benedict as Squimpy
Ray Cooke as Pussy
Jack Pennick as Lefty
Mary Kornman as Peggy
Gloria Rich as Maizie
Oscar O'Shea as Mr. Stephens

Soundtrack

External links 

1938 films
American drama films
American black-and-white films
1938 drama films
Films directed by Bernard Vorhaus
Republic Pictures films
1930s English-language films
1930s American films